Victor Charles Louis Brochard (29 June 1848 – 25 November 1907) was a French philosopher and historian of philosophy.

Life
Victor Brochard was born in Quesnoy-sur-Deûle. He entered the 
École Normale Supérieure in 1868, and in 1872 was appointed professor of philosophy at the lycée de Pau. After a succession of other lycée appointments, he was appointed lecturer at the École Normale Supérieure in 1886. A few years later he was appointed professor of the history of ancient philosophy at the Sorbonne.

Brochard died in Paris.

Friedrich Nietzsche read and used Brochard's book on the Greek Skeptics intensively.

Works
 De l'erreur, 1879.
 (ed.) Discours de la méthode by René Descartes. 1883.
 Les sceptiques grecs, 1887.
 Études de philosophie ancienne et de philosophie moderne, 1912.

References

External link

1848 births
1907 deaths
French philosophers
French historians of philosophy
French male non-fiction writers